Denys Vasin (born 4 March 1989) is a Ukrainian football forward who plays for Jonava on loan from Kryvbas Kryvyi Rih.

Career
He played for Karpaty Lviv. He is the product of the Chornomorets Odesa Youth school system and has played for the reserve squad and youth squad since 2004–2005 season. Vasin also was a member of the Ukraine national under-21 football team.

In 2022 he removied to Lithuania and played for FK Jonava. In 16 April 2022 he made debiut in A Lyga against FC Džiugas. In June 2022 he left club.

References

External links
 Profile on Official Website
 
 

1989 births
Living people
Footballers from Odesa
Ukrainian footballers
Association football forwards
Ukrainian expatriate footballers
Expatriate footballers in Belarus
Expatriate footballers in Lithuania
Ukrainian expatriate sportspeople in Lithuania
Ukrainian expatriate sportspeople in Belarus
Ukrainian Premier League players
FC Chornomorets Odesa players
FC Belshina Bobruisk players
FC Karpaty Lviv players
FC Mariupol players
FC Stal Kamianske players
FC Vorskla Poltava players
FC Inhulets Petrove players
FK Jonava players